Nicolae Talpoş (19 February 1962 – 20 February 1990) was a Romanian boxer. He competed in the men's featherweight event at the 1984 Summer Olympics.

References

External links
 

1962 births
1990 deaths
Romanian male boxers
Olympic boxers of Romania
Boxers at the 1984 Summer Olympics
Place of birth missing
Featherweight boxers